Sakhipur is a town of Sakhipur Upazila, Tangail, Bangladesh. The town is situated 36 km east of Tangail city and 77 km northwest of Dhaka city, the capital of Bangladesh.

Demographics
According to Population Census 2011 performed by Bangladesh Bureau of Statistics, The total population of Sakhipur town is 30028. There are 7473 households in total.

Education
The literacy rate of Sakhipur town is 57.6% (Male-59.8%, Female-55.5%).

See also
 Mirzapur, Bangladesh
 Madhupur, Bangladesh

References

Populated places in Dhaka Division
Populated places in Tangail District
Pourashavas of Bangladesh